Laikipia West Constituency is an electoral constituency in Kenya. It is one of three constituencies in Laikipia County. The constituency was established for the 1966 elections.

Members of Parliament 

|}2017 || Patrick Mariru || Jubilee Party

Wards

References

External links 

Constituencies in Laikipia County
Constituencies in Rift Valley Province
1966 establishments in Kenya
Constituencies established in 1966